The Lilley Formation is a geologic formation in Ohio. It preserves fossils dating back to the Silurian period.

See also

 List of fossiliferous stratigraphic units in Ohio

References
 

Silurian Ohio
Silurian southern paleotemperate deposits